Back in time may refer to:

Film and television
 Back in Time (2015 film), a 2015 American documentary film directed by Jason Aron
 "Back in Time", the fourth episode of the American adult animated television series Sit Down, Shut Up
 Back in Time for..., a British lifestyle television series
 Fleet of Time (also Back in Time), a 2014 Chinese coming-of-age film

Music

Albums
 Back in Time (James Blood Ulmer album), an album by Odyssey the Band
 Back in Time (Judith Hill album), the debut album by American recording artist Judith Hill

Songs
 "Back in Time" (Huey Lewis and the News song), written for and featured in the 1985 film Back to the Future
 "Back in Time" (Pitbull song), originally released as the lead single from the soundtrack of sci-fi film Men in Black 3
 "Back in Time", the 14th track from Seventh Wonder's 2008 album Mercy Falls
 "The Roof (Back in Time)", a song by American singer-songwriter Mariah Carey

Other
 Back in Time (iOS software), an education book app
 Back in Time (Linux software), a backup application